The 2022–23 Coppin State Eagles men's basketball team represented Coppin State University in the 2022–23 NCAA Division I men's basketball season. The Eagles, led by sixth-year head coach Juan Dixon, played their home games at the Physical Education Complex in Baltimore, Maryland as members of the Mid-Eastern Athletic Conference.

Previous season
The Eagles finished the 2021–22 season 9–22, 6–8 in MEAC play to finish tied for sixth place. As the No. 7 seed, they upset No. 2 seed Howard and No. 3 seed North Carolina Central to clinch a spot in the MEAC tournament championship, their first such appearance since 2008. Unlike that prior title appearance, they were unable to win, losing to top-seeded Norfolk State.

Roster

Schedule and results

|-
!colspan=12 style=| Non-conference regular season

|-
!colspan=12 style=| MEAC regular season

|-
!colspan=9 style=| MEAC tournament

Sources

References

Coppin State Eagles men's basketball seasons
Coppin State Eagles
Coppin State Eagles men's basketball
Coppin State Eagles men's basketball